Fieldway tram stop is a light rail stop serving the Fieldway residential area of New Addington, in the London Borough of Croydon in the southern suburbs of London. It is adjacent to a northbound bus stop on the A2022 Lodge Lane.

Services
Fieldway is served by tram services operated by Tramlink. The tram stop is served by trams every 7-8 minutes between New Addington and  via  and Centrale.

During the evenings on weekends, the service is reduced to a tram every 15 minutes.

Services are operated using Bombardier CR4000 and Stadler Variobahn Trams.

Connections
London Buses route 314 serves the stop providing connections to New Addington, Hayes, Bromley and Eltham.

Free interchange for journeys made within an hour is available between bus services and between buses and trams is available at Fieldway as part of Transport for London's Hopper Fare.

References

External links

Fieldway Tram Stop – Timetables and live departures at Transport for London

Tramlink stops in the London Borough of Croydon
Railway stations in Great Britain opened in 2000